Eva Joseph Goldsheid (March 20, 1926 – June 14, 2016) was a German-born American artist and educator, known as painter, and printmaker.

Early life and education
Eva Joseph was on born March 20, 1926 in Halle (Saale), Germany. She was from an Orthodox Jewish family in the banking industry, daughter of Ernest David and Rosa (née Stein) Joseph. Her father died when she was eleven, and she and her mother fled Germany to escape the Nazis. After a brief period in Amsterdam, Joseph and her mother emigrated to New York in 1938, leaving behind everything they owned. Eventually her mother became a medical secretary at Columbia University in order to support them.

Joseph began high school while still in Germany and graduated in 1942 at age 16 after moving to New York. In 1944 she began studying at Hunter College and became interested in art. Desiring to leave New York, Joseph transferred to the University of New Mexico, in Albuquerque, to study painting. While there she met gallerists, curators, and artists including Charles Goldsheid, whom she married in Taos in 1954.

In 1946, as Joseph became progressively immersed in her work as a painter, she moved to the San Francisco Bay Area. She earned two degrees from the University of California, Berkeley (BA 1947; MA 1959). She also attended classes at the California School of Fine Arts (San Francisco Art Institute), where she studied with David Park, who influenced her early painting style. While at UC Berkeley, Joseph also studied Asian art and named her only daughter Sumi, after the sumi-e style of Japanese painting.

Career
Joseph exhibited in group shows at San Francisco Women Artists, Pacific Art League, Berkeley Art Center, and California State University, Hayward. She was a member of the California Society of Printmakers, the Berkeley Art Center Association, and a council member for San Francisco Women Artists.

Joseph taught art for the Hayward, California, Unified School District (1966–1984) and the Fremont, California, Unified School Adult School (1986–1991). After relocating to Southern California in 1991 to be closer to her daughter, she taught art classes at the South Bay Adult School in Manhattan Beach, where she was beloved by many students.

Art
Joseph's greatest and most formative influence was  the Bay Area Figurative school, a midcentury art movement made up of painters who abandoned the prevailing style of abstract expressionism and returned  to figuration during the 1950s and 1960s. The artists initially associated with the movement were David Park, Elmer Bischoff, and Richard Diebenkorn. These three artists taught at the California School of Fine Arts (San Francisco Art Institute), where Joseph was a student. Later on, painters like Nathan Oliveira and Joan Brown joined the movement. Bay Area Figurative artists rendered genre scenes, local landscapes, and figures with bold brushwork and a brazen palette. Although Joseph's paintings range from figuration and emotionally laden narratives to abstraction, she was primarily concerned with the way colors and forms work together on the flat surface of the canvas. Her paintings were regularly exhibited in the Bay Area while she lived there.

Works on paper
Joseph's truly unique style developed in the 1980s when she took up printmaking. Here she successfully combined the lessons of three midcentury styles: Bay Area Figurative painting, modern graphic design, and Japanese woodblock printing. Originally working at Kala Art Institute in Berkeley, California, Joseph produced dozens of striking abstract prints that evoke the midcentury modern aesthetic. Most of these works have not been shown or published. They were discovered in the artist's home after her passing by her daughter Sumi Berney.

Joseph's distinct palette ranges from bright and vivid to warm and earthy. Petal pink, sunshine yellow, mint, fuchsia, turquoise, gold, pumpkin, paprika, and olive all coexist in ways that are reminiscent of the best examples of 1950s and 60s graphic design. The closest comparison is the work of celebrated postwar British textile designer Lucienne Day. Day's pioneering combination of natural, botanical motifs with highly accomplished abstraction and a brilliant use of color-contrast blocks are also defining characteristics of Joseph's prints.

Joseph's use of Japanese woodblock printing technique adds vibrancy to her works on paper. In particular, they appear to be in dialogue with such modern Japanese masters as Saitô Kiyoshi, whose unique style gained appreciation in the 1950s. Like Kiyoshi, Joseph used wood-grain patterns to add texture and interest to her designs. The wood-pattern background is representative of the traditional mokume-zuri (wood-grain printing) technique.

Death 
She died June 14, 2016 in Los Angeles, California.

References

20th-century German painters
German printmakers
1926 births
2016 deaths
University of California, Berkeley alumni
San Francisco Art Institute alumni
21st-century German painters